Clarence Reginald Jenkins (January 10, 1898 - December 6, 1968), nicknamed "Fats",  was an American professional baseball and basketball player from about 1920 to 1940. He played when both professional sports were racially segregated as an African-American. Primarily he played left field in baseball's Negro leagues, and point guard for the barnstorming New York Renaissance on the hardwood, where he was also team captain. He was inducted into the Naismith Memorial Basketball Hall of Fame as part of the Class of 2021.

Biography 
Jenkins was born in New York City where he played basketball for the St. Christopher's Club youth team and then for the first teams that were named "Colored Basketball World's Champions" by the New York Age in 1917, 1918 and 1919. Next he played for the top team of the early 1920s, Cum Posey's Loendi Big Five based in Pittsburgh, and for the New York Renaissance, the last of the Colored World Champions in 1925. From that season through 1939 he captained the "Rens", whom the Basketball Hall of Fame inducted collectively in 1963. In the 1939–40 season Fats captained the powerful Chicago Crusaders which included his old Rens teammate David "Big Dave" DeJernett as well as future Ren Bricktop Wright.  The all-black Crusaders were said to be "sidestepped" from the Chicago World's Pro Tourney that spring, perhaps because Jenkins and Wright had abruptly left the team in a huff over giving sparkplug Agis Bray sufficient playing time,

Meanwhile, Jenkins played Negro league baseball more than twenty seasons with numerous teams based in New York, New Jersey, Pennsylvania, and Maryland; he may be most often associated with the New York Black Yankees, although he managed Brooklyn in 1940. His known career batting and on-base averages are .325 and .392. The East-West All-Star Game was established during his fourteenth season, and he played in the first and third renditions. He was a quick outfielder and baserunner, which fits his denomination as the fastest man in basketball.

Jenkins died at age 70 in Philadelphia, Pennsylvania.

References

External links
 and Baseball-Reference Black Baseball stats and Seamheads
.
New York Renaissance (enshrined 1963) at the Basketball Hall of Fame.

1898 births
1968 deaths
African-American basketball players
American men's basketball players
Baseball players from New York (state)
Baltimore Black Sox players
Bacharach Giants players
Brooklyn Eagles players
Harrisburg Giants players
Lincoln Giants players
New York Black Yankees players
New York Renaissance players
Philadelphia Hilldale Giants players
Philadelphia Stars players
Pittsburgh Crawfords players
Point guards
Washington Black Senators players
20th-century African-American sportspeople